Li Fang (born 1 January 1973) is a retired female tennis player from China. She is widely regarded as the first professional tennis player from China.

Li turned professional in 1990, and won two WTA doubles titles in her career. In singles, Li Fang reached three finals on the WTA tour (Hobart 1995, Makarska and Pattaya in 1998), losing all of them. She represented her country at the 1992 Summer Olympics. Li played seven years on the China Fed Cup team. She retired in 2001.

Personal
Li Fang was born in Hengyang in Hunan province to father Li Jianmin and mother Zhou Shanglian. As of 2014, Li Fangs runs a tennis academy in Frisco, Texas.

WTA Tour career finals

Singles: 3 runner-up

Doubles: 2 titles

ITF finals

Singles (18–6)

Doubles (8–5)

See also
 Tennis in China

References

External links
 
 
 

1973 births
Living people
Chinese female tennis players
Olympic tennis players of China
Tennis players from Hunan
Tennis players at the 1992 Summer Olympics
Asian Games medalists in tennis
Tennis players at the 1990 Asian Games
Tennis players at the 1994 Asian Games
Tennis players at the 1998 Asian Games
Medalists at the 1990 Asian Games
Medalists at the 1994 Asian Games
Medalists at the 1998 Asian Games
Asian Games gold medalists for China
Asian Games silver medalists for China
Asian Games bronze medalists for China